Tobed is a municipality located in the province of Zaragoza, Aragon, Spain. As of 2018, the municipality had a population of 214 inhabitants.

This town is located between the Sierra de Vicort and the Sierra de Algairén in the Grio River valley.

References

Municipalities in the Province of Zaragoza